a retainer under the Japanese clan of Hosokawa during the Edo period (17th century) of Japan. Lord Hosokawa Tadatoshi had previously practiced the Yagyū Shinkage-ryū art of the sword, in which the principal sword master of the fief was none other than the renowned swordsman, Yashiro. 

Tadatoshi had at one time wanted for Yashiro to duel against the famous swordsman, Miyamoto Musashi. Musashi had hesitated when hearing this, because Ujii had precedence of rank over him within the fief and had the status of master. However, they both finally agreed to have a duel against each other. During their duel, Yashiro had fought within the presence of his lord, who had sent away all other vassals, with the exception of one, who was to bear his sword. After the two adepts had fought for three rounds, Yashiro could not defeat Musashi in any way, who did not even yet deliver a blow. When taking into the account of Tadatoshi, Musashi had contented himself with dominating Yashiro by rendering the whole of techniques as ineffective. Tadatoshi himself had fought Musashi after this duel, in which he had later said after never being able to deliver a single blow of his sword, "I never imagined there could be such a difference in levels of accomplishment!.

References

Miyamoto Musashi - Life and Writings

Ujii Yashiro